James Jardine Bell-Irving (24 December 1859 – 8 June 1936) was a Scottish businessman in Hong Kong and China and member of the Executive Council and Legislative Council of Hong Kong.

Son of John Bell-Irving and Mary Jardine, niece of Dr. William Jardine and sister of Sir Robert Jardine, James Jardine was born at St Mungo, Kirkbank, Dumfries And Galloway, Scotland on 24 December 1859 in the family of the Jardine Matheson & Co., one of the largest trading firms in the Far East. He arrived in China in 1881 and became a partner at the company in 1887. He became a director of company for from 1887 to 1902 and also numerous public companies, including the chairman of the Hongkong and Shanghai Banking Corporation.

He was appointed as unofficial member of the Legislative Council of Hong Kong in 1892, 1893, 1896 and 1901 and became the first of the two unofficial members in the Executive Council of Hong Kong in 1896 and again in 1901, until he retired from public and business services and returned to England in 1902.

After going back to England, he lived at Minto House, Hawick and Rokeby, Barnard Castle, and bought the Makerstoun property on the River Tweed near Kelso afterward. He died in London on 8 June 1936.

He married Eva Gertrude Piercy, daughter of Benjamin Piercy in Hong Kong in 1890 and had two daughters:
 Ethel Mary (born 4 October 1891) married Ian Maitland, 15th Earl of Lauderdale
 Eva Margaretta (born 20 July 1893)

See also
 List of Executive Council of Hong Kong unofficial members 1896–1941

References

 

1859 births
1936 deaths
Hong Kong businesspeople
Scottish businesspeople
Hong Kong people of Scottish descent
Scottish expatriates in Hong Kong
Scottish expatriates in China
Members of the Executive Council of Hong Kong
Members of the Legislative Council of Hong Kong
Jardine Matheson Group
Chairmen of HSBC
People from Kelso, Scottish Borders